Ivantets is a rural locality (a village) in Krasnopolyanskoye Rural Settlement, Nikolsky District, Vologda Oblast, Russia. The population was 156 as of 2002.

Geography 
Ivantets is located 29 km northwest of Nikolsk (the district's administrative centre) by road. Butova Kurya is the nearest rural locality.

References 

Rural localities in Nikolsky District, Vologda Oblast